The Hummel H5 is an American amateur-built aircraft, designed by Morry Hummel and produced by Hummel Aviation. The aircraft is supplied as a kit or plans for amateur construction.

Design and development
The H5 is a development of the Hummel Ultracruiser Plus and has a gross weight that is heavier than the original Hummel Bird.

The H5 features a cantilever low-wing, a single-seat enclosed cockpit under a bubble canopy, fixed conventional landing gear, or optionally tricycle landing gear, and a single engine in tractor configuration.

The aircraft is made from sheet aluminum. Construction time from the supplied kit is estimated as 420 hours.

Operational history
By December 2011 twelve examples had been completed and flown.

Specifications (H5)

References

External links

Official video of test flying the H5
Official photo of the H5

Homebuilt aircraft
Single-engined tractor aircraft
Hummel Aviation aircraft